Hubert Soudant (born 16 March 1946 in Maastricht, Netherlands) is a Dutch conductor.  He played the French horn as a youth.  He has won prizes in several conducting competitions, including the Besançon Young Conductor Competition and the Karajan International Conducting Competition.

Soudant has held music directorships with the Utrecht Symphony Orchestra (1974–1980), the Radio France Nouvelle Orchestra Philharmonique (1981–1983), l'Orchestra Toscanini (1988–92), l'Orchestre National des Pays de la Loire (1994–2004) and Mozarteum Orchestra of Salzburg (1994–2004).  He has also served as the principal guest conductor of the Melbourne Symphony Orchestra.  He became principal guest conductor of the Tokyo Symphony Orchestra in October 1999, and music director in September 2004.

References

External links
 Kajimono Concert Management agency biography
 Arena di Verona biography, October 2002
 Tokyo Symphony Orchestra biography of Hubert Soudant

Living people
1946 births
Dutch conductors (music)
Male conductors (music)
Musicians from Maastricht
21st-century conductors (music)
21st-century male musicians
Oehms Classics artists